Atoyac River may refer to the following rivers of Mexico

 Atoyac River (Guerrero)
 Atoyac River (Oaxaca)
 Atoyac River, the alternative name of Balsas River, which flows through the states of Guerrero, Michoacan, Puebla, and others on its way to the Pacific Ocean